Hans-Jürgen Wischnewski (24 July 1922 – 24 February 2005) was a German politician of the Social Democratic Party (SPD).

Life
Born in Allenstein, East Prussia (now Olsztyn, Poland), Wischnewski obtained his Abitur degree in Berlin in 1941. He then served in a Panzergrenadier division of the Wehrmacht in World War II, achieving the rank of Oberleutnant. Wischnewski was decorated with the Iron Cross.

Career
After the war, Wischnewski joined the SPD. He was employed by a metal-working company and from 1952 trained as an IG Metall union secretary. Upon the 1957 federal election, he became a member of the Bundestag parliament and also a SPD board member in the Cologne district. He was elected federal chairman of the party's Young Socialists youth organisation in 1959 and joined the SPD federal committee in 1970, from 1979 as deputy chairman. From 1961 to 1965 he also was an elected member of the European Parliament.

On 1 December 1966, Wischnewski was appointed Federal Minister for Economic Cooperation in the grand coalition cabinet of Chancellor Kurt Georg Kiesinger. He resigned from office on 2 October 1968, to become SPD federal executive director.

Again in May 1974, he again joined the federal government of Chancellor Helmut Schmidt as a state secretary in the Foreign Office, after the 1976 federal election as a state minister in the German Chancellery.

Political influence
Because of his good relations with Arab politicians since the days of the Algerian War, Wischnewski was nicknamed "Ben Wisch" by Chancellor Willy Brandt (later sometimes spoofed as "Ben Cash" because of his duty as the SPD federal treasurer). His efforts decisively improved the West German diplomatic relations with numerous Arab and African countries. Also, after the 1973 Chilean coup d'état, he played a vital role in rescuing German and European hostages.

Wischnewski is best known outside Germany for his involvement in the "German Autumn" of 1977: when the German business executive Hanns Martin Schleyer was kidnapped by the militant Red Army Faction (RAF) in September, Wischnewski visited several Arabian governments and during the joint RAF and PFLP hijacking of Lufthansa Flight 181 in October followed the plane to Mogadishu, negotiating with the Somalian government. His success allowed German GSG 9 troops to storm the plane and rescue 90 hostages; three of the hijackers were killed in the process.

Wischnewski later travelled to Nicaragua, to intermediate between the Sandinista National Liberation Front and its Contra opponents. In Latin America, he became known as "Commandante Hans".

His commitment to the rights of the Palestinian people earned him an award by president Yasser Arafat.  Wischnewski was a long-time member of the German-Arabian Association, until he left after a dispute with its president Jürgen Möllemann. He also was a member of the Steering Committee of the Bilderberg Group.

References

See also
German Autumn

1922 births
2005 deaths
People from Olsztyn
Recipients of the Iron Cross (1939)
Economic Cooperation ministers of Germany
Members of the Bundestag for North Rhine-Westphalia
Members of the Bundestag 1987–1990
Members of the Bundestag 1983–1987
Members of the Bundestag 1980–1983
Members of the Bundestag 1976–1980
Members of the Bundestag 1972–1976
Members of the Bundestag 1969–1972
Members of the Bundestag 1965–1969
Members of the Bundestag 1961–1965
Members of the Bundestag 1957–1961
Members of the Steering Committee of the Bilderberg Group
People from East Prussia
Grand Crosses with Star and Sash of the Order of Merit of the Federal Republic of Germany
Members of the Bundestag for the Social Democratic Party of Germany
German Army officers of World War II